This is a list of the largest cities and towns of England ordered by population at various points during history. Until the first modern census was conducted in 1801 there was no centrally conducted method of determining the populations of England's settlements at any one time, and so data has to be used from a number of other historical surveys. The lists below are derived from the best available data and the ordering is in many cases only approximate.

Iron Age
The first settlements that can genuinely be considered urban appear in the 1st century BC, and are known to archaeologists as oppida. Generally these oppida became the main urban centres of the various tribal divisions used under the Romans. Certain examples include Colchester, St Albans, Silchester, Winchester, and Canterbury, however there may have been many others, such as Dorchester. Their distribution is limited to the south of the country. Estimating the populations of these oppida is fraught with difficulty by the nature of the evidence, and as such no precise hierarchy has yet been established; however it is generally agreed that by the time of the Roman conquest Colchester was probably the largest, perhaps followed by Silchester.

Roman period

When the Romans invaded in AD 43, their key strategic target was the oppidum at Colchester, the capital of the powerful Catuvellauni. Many of the oppida in the south were simply converted over time into Roman towns. However, the Romans were the first to establish urban settlements outside the southeast. How deliberate this process was is open to debate: many towns grew up of their own accord around major army forts, such as at Caerleon or Exeter; these were known as vici. London is something of an exception; it seems to have developed out of a trading colony, and eventually came to eclipse even Colchester in terms of population and importance thanks to its command of the Thames commercial axis. There was no significant Iron Age oppidum in this area. It is again difficult to establish a hierarchy, as direct population records are lacking for this period. The largest city however at least by the second century was London, perhaps followed by Winchester, York and Lincoln.

Anglo-Saxon Period
Urban sites were on the decline from the late Roman period and remained of very minor importance until around the 9th century. The largest cities in later Anglo-Saxon England however were Winchester, London and York, in that order, although London had eclipsed Winchester by the 11th century. Details of population size are however lacking.

Norman Period

The Norman conquest of 1066 changed the demographics of England significantly, with many settlements being destroyed by the invading army. In 1086, William the Conqueror ordered the creation of the Domesday Book, a systematic survey of the kingdom of England. Over 100 settlements were classified as "borough" status and the number of houses or burgesses were counted. Nonetheless, it is not possible to know precisely the population of any borough because the residents per household is uncertain and the reported lands which form the borough are often debatable. London was comfortably the largest borough in England and has remained so ever since, though it was not assessed in the Domesday survey, nor were Winchester, Bristol, and several other larger boroughs. Their populations must be estimated by other means.

Late Medieval Period
By the start of the 14th century the structure of most English towns had changed considerably since the Domesday survey. A number of towns were granted market status and had grown around local trades.  Also notable is the reduction in importance of Winchester, the Anglo-Saxon capital city of Wessex.

Although not a direct measure of population, the lay subsidy rolls of 1334 can be used as a measure of both a settlement's size and stature and the table gives the 30 largest towns and cities in England according to that report. The lay subsidy, an early form of poll tax, however, omitted a sizeable proportion of the population.

In 1377 the first true poll tax was levied in which everyone over the age of 14 who was not exempt was required to pay a groat to the Crown. The records taken listed the name and location of everyone who paid the tax and so give an excellent measure of the population at the time, although assumptions need to be made about the proportion of the population who were under 14, generally taken to be around a third.

Early Modern Period

No strong information for population exists for the 15th century, with most modern estimates relying on analyses of baptism records. For the 16th century, the lay subsidy returns of 1523-1527 once again provide an excellent measure of households and adult population from which the overall populations can be estimated. The table shows the prosperity of East Anglia, principally due to the wool trade, accounting for eleven of the top thirty (whereas only one, Norwich, makes the top thirty largest towns and cities today).

17th/18th century
The 17th and 18th centuries proved a low point for Britain's demography with no major structured survey of the nation's populations. The best estimate from this period is obtained from the hearth tax of 1662, which formed a survey of the number of hearths in each home. As with the Domesday survey, this did not form a direct measure of population but can be extrapolated to provide an estimate of the population of a town. The 1662 table gives the approximate order of the towns of the time from the survey. Most notable from a modern viewpoint is the fact that Manchester, Birmingham, Leeds, Liverpool and Sheffield do not make the top thirty, whereas within around 100 years they would become England's largest provincial cities. The 1750 table is again formed from estimates.

Rankings by year

19th century
The Census Act 1800 resulted in Great Britain's first modern Census a year later, and other than 1941 a census has been taken every ten years since. The resulting populations of England's towns and cities clearly shows the effect of the Industrial Revolution on the urban population, particularly in the growth of the cities of the north and north-west. The data in the tables are taken from the censuses.

Rankings by year

20th century
Measurement of the population of England's towns and cities during the 20th century is complicated by determining what forms a separate "town" and where its exact boundaries lie, with boundaries often being moved. The lists are those of the constituent towns and cities, as opposed to those of the district or conurbation. For example, Salford is measured separately to Manchester, and Gateshead to Newcastle. The only exception to this is London for which the measure is that of Greater London. See English cities by population for further discussion.

Rankings by years

Notes

References

See also
List of towns and cities in England by population
Demography of England - for the population of England at various points in history.
List of lost settlements in the United Kingdom

Cities
Population
Economic history of England
English history-related lists
Cities
England
Former populated places in England